Zid may refer to:

 Degtyarev Plant, abbreviated ЗиД (ZiD)
 Indianapolis Air Route Traffic Control Center, abbreviated ZID
 Zid, alternate name of Barmazid-e Sofla, a village in South Khorasan Province, Iran
 Zeyd, South Khorasan, a village in South Khorasan Province, Iran
 Zid (1976 film), a 1976 Bollywood film
 Zid (1994 film), a 1994 Bollywood film
 Zid (2014 film), a 2014 Bollywood erotic thriller film
 Zid (TV series), on Hum TV a 2014 Pakistani TV Series
 Zid (TV series) on Express Entertainment, a 2014 Pakistani TV Series

See also
 Zeyd (disambiguation)